Primary Music is an Israeli independent record label, specializing in World Music, New Age, Lounge and ambient. Primary Music is located in Tel Aviv, Israel.

In September 2003, having quit her former label, world music singer Suzy established 'Primary Music' as an independent label. Her goal was to create a personal label that can promote her music according to her own artistic perception. Later the label became a home for other "world music" performers.

Artists
These artists have released recordings through Primary Music:
 Margalit Matitiahu
 Nissim Amon (Zen Master)
 Khalas
 David Broza
 Omar Faruk Tekbilek

See also 
 List of record labels

External links
 Official site

Israeli independent record labels
Record labels established in 2003
World music record labels
Ambient music record labels